Thurey-le-Mont is a commune in the Doubs department in the Bourgogne-Franche-Comté region in eastern France.

Geography
Half of its territory is covered by forest.

Population

See also
 Communes of the Doubs department

References

External links

 Thurey-le-Mont on the regional Web site 

Communes of Doubs